Marton is a village on the Furness peninsula in the county of Cumbria, England. It shares a church, a parish council and primary school with the nearby Lindal-in-Furness.

References

External links

Lindal and Marton community website

 

Villages in Cumbria
Furness
Barrow-in-Furness